Mary Hannah Lauck (born 1963) is a United States district judge of the United States District Court for the Eastern District of Virginia and former United States magistrate judge of the same court.

Biography

Lauck received a Bachelor of Arts degree, magna cum laude, in 1986 from Wellesley College. She received a Juris Doctor in 1991 from Yale Law School. She served as a law clerk to Judge James R. Spencer of the United States District Court for the Eastern District of Virginia from 1991 to 1992. She worked at the law firm of Anderson, Kill, Olick & Oshinsky, from 1992 to 1994. From 1994 to 2004, she was an Assistant United States Attorney in the Eastern District of Virginia. She was the Supervising Attorney at Genworth Financial, Inc., from 2004 to 2005. From 2005 to 2014, she served as a United States magistrate judge in the Eastern District of Virginia.

Federal judicial service

On December 19, 2013, President Barack Obama nominated Lauck to serve as a United States District Judge of the United States District Court for the Eastern District of Virginia, to the seat which was vacated by Judge James R. Spencer, who assumed senior status on March 25, 2014. She received a hearing before the United States Senate Judiciary Committee on February 25, 2014. On March 27, 2014, her nomination was reported out of committee by a voice vote. On June 5, 2014, Senate Majority Leader Harry Reid filed for cloture on the nomination. On June 9, 2014, The United States Senate invoked cloture on her nomination by a 52–32 vote. On June 10, 2014, her nomination was confirmed by a 90–0 vote. She received her judicial commission on June 10, 2014.

References

External links

1963 births
Living people
21st-century American judges
American women lawyers
Assistant United States Attorneys
Judges of the United States District Court for the Eastern District of Virginia
Lawyers from Alexandria, Virginia
United States district court judges appointed by Barack Obama
United States magistrate judges
Virginia lawyers
Wellesley College alumni
Yale Law School alumni
21st-century American women judges